Arabi may refer to:
 Arabi, Bushehr (عربي - ‘Arabī)
 Arabi, Fars (عربي - ‘Arabī)
 Arabi, Hormozgan (ارابي - Ārābī)